Boldağ is a village in the District of Finike, Antalya Province, Turkey.

References

Villages in Finike District